The Civil Defence Auxiliary Unit (CDAU) is part of the Singapore Civil Defence Force (SCDF) consisting of uniformed volunteers.

The volunteering programme in SCDF was first started in 1982 under the National Civil Defence Plan and Volunteer Scheme which provided an avenue through which residents can volunteer their service in civil defence roles within their local community. However, these volunteer residents were not expected to perform duties to the level that of a professional SCDF officer.

In response to the increased threat of terrorism following the September 11, 2001 attacks in New York City, there was a growing need to enhance the civil defence capability of the country. In addition, SCDF realised that in the wake of a crisis such as severe acute respiratory syndrome, Nicoll Highway collapse, 2004 Indian Ocean earthquake and tsunami, large scale manpower is required for sustained deployment which will be taxing on its standard regulars. Mobilisation of NS men is not feasible due to impact on economic activity and deemed too heavy a response.

As a result, a new form of volunteer organisation, the Civil Defence Auxiliary Unit, was created to provide an immediate pool of ready personnel. Modelled from the Singapore Police Force’s Volunteer Special Constabulary (VSC) scheme of service, members of the CDAU are given the same status and authority of regular SCDF officers. They are expected to perform frontline operational duties alongside regulars. As volunteers, CDAU officers are paid an allowance instead of wages.

In April 2006, the Civil Defence Auxiliary Unit (CDAU) was officially launched to provide an avenue for the public to volunteer their service with the Singapore Civil Defence Force (SCDF). CDAU comprises volunteers from all walks of life, from professionals to blue-collar executives to even undergraduate, bonded with the same aspiration to serve the nation by complementing the Singapore Civil Defence Force. Donning SCDF uniforms and possessing the same status and powers of SCDF regulars, CDAU officers perform frontline duties alongside regular officers in the areas of fire-fighting & rescue, emergency ambulance service, community involvement, public education.  Professionals with the expertise in specialised areas such as Fire Safety, Info-Communications, Chemistry, Life Sciences and Chemical Engineering may enter directly into the Senior Officer scheme.

In late 2010, 3 more CDAU vocations are created which are Enforcement Officer, Heritage Gallery Guide and Search Dog Handler.  In future, CDAU Officers may also be participating in national events such as NDP, F1 etc. to supplement the regular force.  Since 2015, CDAU firefighters scheme is extended to those without prior fire-fighting experience for both male and female.  These fresh volunteers must complete a 16-week non-residential fire-fighting course conducted after office hours at Civil Defence Academy.  Upon graduation, these volunteer fire-fighters are awarded the fire badge identical to regulars. The first batch graduated in late 2015 becoming the first volunteer fire-fighters in SCDF history.  CDAU celebrated its 10th anniversary in 2016.

Recruitment 
Since its inception, the target is to reach a pool of about 500 CDAU Officers within 5 years. SCDF holds periodical recruitment via SCDF web portal to attract new candidates.  Applicants must meet certain basic physical and academic requirements or can be former SCDF Servicemen.  Basic requirements include: 18 years old & above, secondary education. Singapore citizenship or permanent residency, as well as minimum weight and height requirements.  Male recruits must have completed full-time NS. Applicants are offered direct entry into any of the 7 vocations.

 Fire Fighting & Rescue
 Emergency Medical Services
 Public Education & Community Involvement
 Expertise Group
 Enforcement Officer
 Heritage Gallery Guide
 Search Dog Handler (defunct)
 Ops Centre Specialist

Training 
Depending on the type of service, non-residentical training is conducted at the Civil Defence Academy (CDA) located at Jalan Bahar or at the Division HQ after office hours or weekends. Upon successful completion of training, CDAU officers will be deployed to the respective Division HQ or Fire Stations.

Service & Deployment 
CDAU is not an independent unit but placed subordinate to the different line units. Senior Officers (Lieutenant & Above) and Junior Officers (Senior Warrant Officer & Below) serve at least 24 and 16 hours respectively per month. They are required to serve a minimum of 2 hours per duty. Former SCDF regulars and national servicemen are given their last-held rank subject to approval. Those who are not previously served in SCDF will start with the corporal rank. Like the regulars and NS men, CDAU officers are rewarded similarly for their respective IPPT results. CDAU officers are also eligible for commendations and service medals awarded to their regular counterparts.  With effect from November 2016, the hourly allowance increase from $3.60 to $4.60 meant to offset out-of-pocket expenses such as transport and food.  As a result of the home team unified rank structure and scheme started in July 2016, new CDAU officers will start off as SGT 1 from July 2017 onwards.  Most of the existing CDAU officers holding corporal rank will be emplaced to SGT 1 similarly.

CDAU officers can remain active in service as long as he is medically fit, up to the age of 50 for junior officers or 55 for Senior Officers. As CDAU follows SCDF rank structure, auxiliary officers must meet the stringent requirement as their regular counterparts to be eligible for career progression.  Similarly to their regular counterpart, CDAUs must clear their annual IPPTs and other mandatory tests required for the respective vocations. Duty in CDAU are not counted as part of reservist liability.  CDAU members are also trained in SG Secure initiatives from 2016 onwards.

Attire 
Auxiliary officers are issued with either the working or field dress, similar to that of ordinary SCDF officers, to suit their working conditions. Auxiliary officers uses identical equipment with their regular counterparts.  Currently, only the difference in epaulette distinguish between ordinary SCDF officers and Auxiliary officers. Auxiliary Officers are allowed to don the respective SCDF decoration identical to their regular counterparts whenever qualified.

From April 2014 onwards, CDAU Officers don the similar epaulette as SCDF Officers.  CDAU Officers are distinguish by a badge pinned on the top right breast pocket.

Others 
CDAU should not be confused with Community Emergency Response Team (CERTs) as the latter is a non-uniformed organisation under People's Association and is only limited to support in its own community with lesser duty obligation.  When the Committee to Strengthen National Service (CSNS) report is released in May 2014, CDAU was mentioned.  Following that, CDAU was quoted on several media included Minister of Defence speech in Parliament seating.

In popular culture 
Fictional Television programs
 Fiery Passion (烈焰焚情), 12 February 1992
 On the Frontline (穿梭生死线), 2000
 Life Line, 2005
 Without Warning 26 October 2006
 Life Line 2, 15 May 2007
 Rescue 995, 06 Feb 2012

See also 
 Ministry of Home Affairs (Singapore)
 Home Team Volunteers Network
 National Civil Defence Cadet Corps
 Volunteer fire department

External links 
 
 CDAU Facebook Page
 Home Team Volunteer
 Committee to Strengthen National Service

Organisations of the Singapore Government